Harpullia pendula, known as the tulipwood or tulip lancewood is a small to medium-sized rainforest tree from Australia. The tree's small size, pleasant form and attractive fruit ensures the popularity of this ornamental tree. The range of natural distribution is from the Bellinger River in northern New South Wales to Coen in tropical Queensland. Tulipwood occurs in various types of rainforest, by streams or dry rainforests on basaltic or alluvial soils. In tropical and sub tropical rainforest. Often seen as a street tree, such as at St Ives, New South Wales.

Description 
A medium-sized tree, up to 24 metres tall and a stem diameter of 60 cm. Usually seen much smaller. As a street tree, it's mostly under 6 metres tall with an attractive and shapely crown. The trunk is irregular in shape, often fluted. Bark is grey and scaly.

Leaves 
Leaves are pinnate and alternate on the stem. There are three to eight leaflets, mostly 5 to 12 cm long, 2 to 5 cm wide. Elliptic or narrowly elliptic. With a short blunt point at the tip. Often the leaf base is unequal. Leaf veins clearly seen on both sides, midrib raised on both surfaces.

Flowers 
Flowers form on panicles from November to January, being greenish yellow, 15 mm in diameter.

Fruit and regeneration 
Fruit forms from August to October, being a two lobed capsule. Yellow or red. Sometimes containing two shiny black or dark brown seeds. The colourful fruit is one of the most appealing features of this ornamental plant. Fresh seed is advised for regeneration. Seeds germinate easily from two weeks to two months.

Uses 
A popular ornamental tree. The timber is well regarded. Excellent for turnery and cabinet timber. Fine grained, tough, heavy and durable.

References

 

pendula
Sapindales of Australia
Trees of Australia
Flora of Queensland
Flora of New South Wales
Ornamental trees
Taxa named by Ferdinand von Mueller
Taxa named by Jules Émile Planchon